The 2022 South African Rugby League season was the twelfth season of domestic rugby league in South Africa. Two competitions were contested, the Rhino Cup (First Division) and Protea Cup (Second Division), with twelve clubs taking part overall.

Rhino Cup

Teams

Results

Round 1

Round 2

Round 3

Round 4

Round 5

Round 6

Ladder

Finals 
The top 4 teams contested the finals in a straight knockout format.

Protea Cup

Teams

Results

Round 1

Round 2

Round 3

Round 4

Round 5

Ladder

Finals 
All four teams participated in the finals.

See also
Rugby League in South Africa
Rhino Cup
Protea Cup
Western Province Rugby League
Jan Prinsloo Regional Cup

References 

2021 in rugby league
2022 in rugby league
South Africa Rugby League
Rug
Rug